
Year 314 (CCCXIV) was a common year starting on Friday (link will display the full calendar) of the Julian calendar. At the time, it was known as the Year of the Consulship of Rufius and Annianus (or, less frequently, year 1067 Ab urbe condita). The denomination 314 for this year has been used since the early medieval period, when the Anno Domini calendar era became the prevalent method in Europe for naming years.

Events 
 By place 
 Roman Empire 
 A large Pictish raid southwards is attempted.

 By topic 
 Religion 
 January 10 – Pope Miltiades' reign ends.
 January 31 – Pope Sylvester I succeeds Pope Miltiades as the 33rd pope.
 August 30 – Council of Arles: Confirms the pronouncement of Donatism as a schism, and passes other canons.
 Synod of Ancyra: Consulting a magician is declared a sin earning five years of penance.
 Alexander becomes Bishop of Byzantium.

Births 
 Libanius, Greek rhetorician and sophist (approximate date)
 Li Qi, Chinese emperor of the Cheng Han Dynasty (d. 338) 
 Zhi Dun, Chinese Buddhist monk and philosopher (d. 366)

Deaths 
 January 10 – Miltiades (or Melchiades), bishop of Rome 
 Liu E (or Lihua), Chinese empress of the Xiongnu state
 Wang Jun (or Pengzu), Chinese general and warlord (b. 252)
 Zhang Gui, Chinese governor and duke of Xiping (b. 255)

References